Raymond Protti is a University of Alberta graduate with a BA and MA in economics. Protti was the director of the Canadian Security Intelligence Service (CSIS) from 1992 through 1994. He previously held positions as President and CEO of the Canadian Bankers Association, and Deputy Minister of Agriculture and Agri-food and of Labour Canada.

References

Living people
Directors of the Canadian Security Intelligence Service
Year of birth missing (living people)